Rafał Kobryń (born 5 December 1999) is a Polish professional footballer who plays as a defender.

Career statistics

Notes

References

External links

1999 births
Living people
Polish footballers
Association football defenders
Lechia Gdańsk players
Lechia Gdańsk II players
Chojniczanka Chojnice players
Korona Kielce players
Sandecja Nowy Sącz players
Ekstraklasa players
I liga players
IV liga players
Sportspeople from Gdańsk